When a work's copyright expires, it enters the public domain. The following is a list of works that entered the public domain in 2021. Since laws vary globally, the copyright status of some works are not uniform.

Entering the public domain in countries with life + 70 years
With the exception of Belarus (where the copyright protection is life + 50 years) and Spain (which has a copyright term of life + 80 years for creators that died before 1987), a work enters the public domain in Europe 70 years after the creator's death, if it was published during the creator's lifetime. For previously unpublished material, those who publish it first will have the publication rights for 25 years. The list is sorted alphabetically and includes a notable work of the creator that entered the public domain on 1 January 2021.

Entering the public domain in countries with life + 80 years
Spain (for creators that died before 1987), Colombia and Equatorial Guinea have a copyright term of life + 80 years. The list is sorted alphabetically and includes one notable work that entered the public domain on 1 January 2021 for each creator.

Entering the public domain in countries with life + 50 years
In most countries of Africa and Asia, as well as Belarus, Bolivia, Canada, New Zealand, Egypt and Uruguay, a work enters the public domain 50 years after the creator's death.

Entering the public domain in Australia

In 2004 copyright in Australia changed from a "plus 50" law to a "plus 70" law, in line with America and the European Union. However, the change was not made retroactive (unlike the 1995 change in the European Union which brought the works of those who died from 1925 to 1944 back into copyright). Hence the work of an author who died before 1955 is normally in the public domain in Australia; but the copyright of authors was extended to 70 years after death for those who died in 1955 or later, and no more Australian authors will come out of copyright until 1 January 2026 (those who died in 1955).

Unpublished works by authors who died in 1950 entered the public domain. Any published literary, artistic, dramatic, or musical work (other than computer programs) by a not generally known author (anonymous or pseudonymous) from 1950 also entered the public domain.

Entering the public domain in the United States

Under the Copyright Term Extension Act,
books published in 1925,
films released in 1925,
and other works published in 1925, entered the public domain in 2021.  Additionally, unpublished works whose authors died in 1950 entered the public domain.

No sound recordings entered the public domain; under the Music Modernization Act, those published in 1925 will not enter the public domain until 2026.  However, all musical compositions published in 1925 entered the public domain in 2021.

Notable books that entered the public domain in 2021 in the United States include The Great Gatsby, Mrs Dalloway, the original German-language version of The Trial, An American Tragedy, The Secret of Chimneys, In Our Time, and Arrowsmith.

See also 
 List of American films of 1925
 List of countries' copyright lengths
 Public Domain Day
 Creative Commons
 Public Domain
 Over 300 public domain authors available in Wikisource (any language), with descriptions from Wikidata
 1950 in literature, 1960 in literature, 1970 in literature

References

Further reading

External links

Popular Books of 1925 at Goodreads

Public domain
Public domain